Daniel Haller (born September 14, 1929) is an American film and television director, production designer, and art director.

Life and career
Haller was born in Glendale, California on September 14, 1929. He studied at the Chouinard Art Institute in Los Angeles. In 1953, Haller started as an art director in television and then later made low budget feature films.  Haller designed sets for Roger Corman's Edgar Allan Poe film series, including House of Usher (1960) and The Pit and the Pendulum (1961).  Haller directed his first film, Die, Monster, Die!, in 1965 for American International Pictures, based on H. P. Lovecraft's short story "The Colour Out of Space". After directing two motorcycle pictures, Devil's Angels (1967) and The Wild Racers (1968), Haller filmed another Lovecraft adaptation, The Dunwich Horror (1970).

From 1972, all of Haller's subsequent work has been in television, including directing episodes of Night Gallery, Kojak, Sara, Battlestar Galactica, Buck Rogers in the 25th Century and Knight Rider.

References

External links

1929 births
Living people
American art directors
American production designers
American television directors
Film directors from California
People from Greater Los Angeles